Al-Risalah al-Dhahabiah ("The Golden Treatise") is a medical dissertation on health and remedies attributed to Ali ibn Musa al-Ridha (765–818), the eighth Imam of Shia. He wrote this dissertation in accordance with the demand of Ma'mun, the caliph of the time. It is revered as the most precious Islamic literature in the science of medicine, and was entitled "the golden treatise" as Ma'mun had ordered it written in gold ink. The chain of narrators is said to reach Muhammad ibn Jumhoor or al-Hassan ibn Muhammad al-Nawfali who is described as "highly esteemed and trustworthy" by al-Najjashi.

The treatise of Ali al-Ridha includes scientific branches such as Anatomy, Physiology, Chemistry and Pathology when medical science was still primitive. According to the treatise, one's health is determined by four humors of blood, yellow bile, black bile and phlegm, the suitable proportion of which maintains the health. The liver plays an important role in producing and maintaining the required proportions in the body. Ali al-Ridha describes the body as a kingdom whose king is the heart while the (blood) vessels, the limbs, and the brain are the laborers. The issue of the authorship and the transmission of the text has been critically analysed in the studies by Speziale (2004) and Speziale - Giurini (2009).

Author

The treatise is authored by Ali al-Ridha who was the seventh descendant of the Islamic prophet Muhammad and the eighth of the Twelve Imams. His given name was 'Alī ibn Mūsā ibn Ja'far. He was born in the house of Imam Musa al-Kadhim (the seventh Imam of Twelver Shia Islam) in Medina on the eleventh of Dhu al-Qi'dah, 148 AH (December 29, 765 CE). Ali al-Ridha was summoned to Khurasan and reluctantly accepted the role of successor to Ma'mun that was forced on him. He did not outlive Ma'mun, having been given poisoned grapes by him while accompanying him in Persia, and died at Tus on May 26, 818. Ali al-Ridha is buried within Imam Ridha Mosque, in Mashhad, Iran.

Background
The Ma'mun's palace was a center for philosophical and scientific researches in which many scientific seminars were held. One of the mentioned seminars was on man's body which included the greatest scholars and leaders.   Ali al-Ridha, Ma'mun, Gabriel b. Bakhtishu (the physician), Masawaiyh (the physician) and Salih ibn Salhama (the Indian philosopher) were some participants of that medical seminar. The participants were involved in a lengthy discussion about the body makeup and various types of foods, while Ali al-Ridha kept silent. Afterwards, Ma'mun asked him to demonstrate his knowledge of physiology and nutrition and Imam replied: 
Soon after that, Ma'mun departed for Balkh, and wrote to Imam asking him to fulfill his promise and write a treatise on the body and its health, hence Imam authored "The Golden Treatise" at the request of Ma'mun.

Contents

The dissertation of Ali al-Ridha includes scientific branches such as Anatomy, Physiology, Chemistry and Pathology when medical science was still primitive. it begins as follows:
Ali al-Ridha writes in his treatise that one's health is in accordance with the balance of phlegm, yellow bile, blood and black bile; an individual becomes sick when this proportion is unbalanced. Nutrition and traditional medicine may be used to cure imbalances. The liver plays an important role in producing and maintaining the required proportions in the body.

Ali al-Ridha describes the body as a kingdom whose king is the heart while the (blood) vessels, the limbs, and the brain are workers. He then continues as such:

Imam al-Rida names the main organs of the human body as the heart, the nerves, the brain, the hands and the Legs the ear and the eye. He discusses their characteristics and functions in detail. Regarding the human body containing systems and cells he said:
In another part of the treatise, he discusses what kind of foods are suitable according to season, time of the day and the age of an individual. He says:
In other parts, he discusses body disease, months and seasons of the year.

Reception
Ali ibn Musa al-Rida sent his dissertation to Ma'mun who was very pleased to receive it and showed his great interest by ordering that the treatise be written down in gold ink, hence it came to be known as the "Gold Treatise". Ma'mun praised it and said:

Commentaries on the treatise

Various commentaries have been written on this dissertation some of which are as follows:

 Tarjamat al-Alawi lil Tibb al-Radawi by Sayyid Diaud-Din Abul-Rida Fadlallah ibn Ali al-Rawandi (548 AH)
 Tarjamat al-Dhahabiyya by mawla Faydallah 'Usarah al-Shushtari
 Tarjamat al-Dhahabiyya by Muhammad Baqir Majlisi. (Available at the private library of the late Sayyid Hassan al-Sadr, Kazimiyya, Iraq)
 Afiyat al-Bariyya fi Sharh al-Dhahabiyya by Mirza Muhammad Hadi son of Mirza Muhammad Salih al-Shirazi
 Sharh Tibb al-Rida by mawla Muhammad Sharif al-Khatoonabadi. (around 1120 AH)
 Tarjamat al-Dhahabiyya by Sayyid Shamsud-Din Muhammad ibn Muhammad Badi' al-Radawi al-Mashhadi.
 Sharh Tibb al-Rida by mawla Nawrooz Ali al-Bastami.

See also

 Al-Risalah al-Huquq
 Nahj al-Balagha
 Al-Sahifa al-Sajjadiyya
 Al-Sahifat al-Ridha
 List of Shia books

References

External links
 
 Fabrizio Speziale, “La Risāla al-dahabiyya, traité médical attribué à l'imām ‘Alī al-Riżā’”. Luqman. Annales des Presses Universitaires d'Iran, vol. XX, n. 2 (40), 2004 (2005), pp. 7-34, [ISSN 0259-904X].
 Fabrizio Speziale - Giorgio Giurini, 2009, Il Trattato aureo sulla medicina attribuito a l’imām ‘Alī al-Riḍā, Palermo, Officina di Studi Medievali (series Machina Philosophorum).

9th-century Arabic books
Medical works of the medieval Islamic world
Scientific works of the Abbasid Caliphate
Shia literature
Hadith
Treatises
Ali al-Ridha